Robert Golden Armstrong Jr. (April 7, 1917 – July 27, 2012) was an American character actor and playwright. A veteran performer who appeared in dozens of Westerns during his 40-year career, he may be best remembered for his work with director Sam Peckinpah.

Early life
Armstrong was born in Pleasant Grove, Alabama, and was reared on a small farm near Birmingham. He came from a family of fundamentalist Christians, and his mother wanted him to be a pastor. After graduating from Hueytown High School in 1935, Armstrong initially enrolled at Howard College, now Samford University in Homewood, Alabama, where he became interested in acting, and then transferred to the University of North Carolina (UNC) at Chapel Hill, North Carolina.  While there, he began acting on stage with the Carolina Playmakers. Upon graduating, he attended the Actors Studio.

Armstrong wanted to write, rather than act, and said in 1966, "I struggled so hard to be a serious writer." As a student at UNC he wrote a three-act play that was produced. By 1966, he had written "nine full-length plays, four unpublished novels, and 50 unpublished poems."

Career
On Broadway, Armstrong portrayed Dr. Baugh and Big Daddy in Cat on a Hot Tin Roof (1955), Sheriff Talbott in Orpheus Descending (1957), and Captain Keller in The Miracle Worker (1959). He also began writing his own plays, which were performed off-Broadway.

Armstrong's first film appearance was in the 1954 film Garden of Eden; however, it was television where he first earned a name for himself. He guest-starred in virtually every television western series produced in the 1950s and 1960s, including Have Gun - Will Travel, The Californians, Jefferson Drum, The Tall Man, Riverboat, The Rifleman, Zane Grey Theater, Wanted: Dead or Alive, The Westerner, The Big Valley, Bonanza, Maverick (as Louise Fletcher's character's father in the episode which drew the series' largest single viewership, "The Saga of Waco Williams"), Gunsmoke (S7E10 as hard nosed Union soldier Capt. Benter”), Rawhide, Wagon Train, and Bat Masterson.

Armstrong appeared on The Twilight Zone, in the episode "Nothing in the Dark" along with Robert Redford. He appeared in three episodes of Perry Mason, twice in the role of the defendant.  In 1958, he appeared in the episode "The Case of the Black-Eyed Blonde" as character Matthew Bartlett. In 1959, he played character Harry Bright in "The Case of the Petulant Partner," then in 1962 he played John Gregory in "The Case of the Stand-in Sister." Armstrong also appeared on Alfred Hitchcock Presents, The Everglades, The Andy Griffith Show, The Fugitive, Daniel Boone, T.H.E. Cat, Hawaii Five-O, Starsky and Hutch, The Dukes of Hazzard, Dynasty, and in the miniseries War and Remembrance. Armstrong had a recurring role in the second season of Millennium as a reclusive visionary known only as the Old Man.  In the late 1980s, he played the demonic recurring character "Uncle Lewis Vendredi" in the Canadian horror series Friday the 13th: The Series.

While working on The Westerner in 1960, Armstrong met the up-and-coming writer/director Sam Peckinpah. The two men immediately struck up a friendship. Peckinpah recognized Armstrong's inner turmoil regarding the religious beliefs of his family and utilized that to brilliant effect in his films. Armstrong would almost always play a slightly unhinged fundamentalist Christian in Peckinpah's films, usually wielding a Bible in one hand and a shotgun in the other. This character archetype appeared in Ride the High Country (1962), Major Dundee (1965), and perhaps most memorably in Pat Garrett and Billy the Kid (1973). However, Armstrong also appeared in The Ballad of Cable Hogue (1970), playing a more likeable character.

Even outside of Peckinpah's work, Armstrong became a tier-one character actor in his own right, appearing in dozens of films over his career, playing both villains and sympathetic characters. Some of his more memorable roles outside of Peckinpah's films include a sympathetic rancher in El Dorado (1966), Cap'n Dan in The Great White Hope (1970), outlaw Clell Miller in The Great Northfield Minnesota Raid (1972), a bumbling outlaw in My Name is Nobody (1973), a secret Satanic cultist sheriff in Race with the Devil (1975), The Car (1977), as well as Children of the Corn (1984), Red Headed Stranger (1986) with Willie Nelson, and as General Phillips in Predator (1987). He appeared in several of Warren Beatty's films, including Heaven Can Wait (1978), Reds (1981), and as the character Pruneface in Dick Tracy (1990).

He semi-retired from films and television in the late 1990s, but he continued to be active in off-Broadway theater in New York and Los Angeles, until finally retiring from acting in 2005 because of near-blindness due to cataracts. 

In 1991, Armstrong gained critical praise for his portrayal of the title character in the music video for "Enter Sandman" from heavy metal band Metallica.

Personal life and death
Armstrong was married three times: his first wife was Ann Neale, with whom he had four children; he was then married to Susan Guthrie until 1976; he was married to his third wife, Mary Craven, until her death in 2003. Armstrong died of natural causes at the age of 95 on July 27, 2012, at his home in Studio City, California.

Selected filmography

 Garden of Eden (1954) as J. Randolph Latimore
 Baby Doll (1956) as Townsman Sid (voice, uncredited)
 A Face in the Crowd (1957) as TV Prompter Operator (uncredited)
 From Hell to Texas (1958) as Hunter Boyd
 Never Love a Stranger (1958) as Flix
 No Name on the Bullet (1959) as Asa Canfield
 The Fugitive Kind (1960) as Sheriff Jordan Talbott
 Ten Who Dared (1960) as Oramel Howland
 Ride the High Country (1962) as Joshua Knudsen
 He Rides Tall (1964) as Joshua 'Josh' McCloud
 Major Dundee (1965) as Reverend Dahlstrom
 El Dorado (1967) as Kevin MacDonald
 80 Steps to Jonah (1969) as Mackray
 Tiger by the Tail (1970) as Ben Holmes
 The Ballad of Cable Hogue (1970) as Quittner
 Angels Die Hard (1970) as Mel
 The McMasters (1970) as Watson
 The Great White Hope (1970) as Cap'n Dan
 J. W. Coop (1971) as Jim Sawyer
 Justin Morgan Had a Horse (1972) as Squire Fisk
 The Final Comedown (1972) as Mr. Freeman
 The Great Northfield, Minnesota Raid (1972) as Clell Miller
 The Legend of Hillbilly John (1972) as Bristowe
 Gentle Savage (1973) as Rupert Beeker - Owner of 'Beeker's Bar'
 Pat Garrett and Billy the Kid (1973) as Ollinger
 White Lightning (1973) as Big Bear
 Running Wild (1973) as Bull
 My Name is Nobody (1973) as Honest John 
 Cotter (1973) as Jack
 Boss Nigger (1975) as Mayor Griffin
 Race with the Devil (1975) as Sheriff Taylor
 White Line Fever (1975) as Prosecutor
 Mean Johnny Barrows (1976) as Richard
 Stay Hungry (1976) as Thor Erickson
 Dixie Dynamite (1976) as Charlie White - Bank President
 Mr. Billion (1977) as Sheriff T.C. Bishop
 The Car (1977) as Amos
 The Pack (1977) as Cobb
 Texas Detour (1978) as Sheriff Burt
 Heaven Can Wait (1978) as General Manager
 Devil Dog: The Hound of Hell (1978) as Dunworth
 The Time Machine (1978) as Gen. Harris
 Good Luck, Miss Wyckoff (1979) as Mr. Hemmings
 Fast Charlie... the Moonbeam Rider (1979) as Al Barber
 Steel (1979) as Kellin
 Where the Buffalo Roam (1980) as Judge Simpson
 Evilspeak (1981) as Sarge
 Raggedy Man (1981) as Rigby
 The Pursuit of D.B. Cooper (1981) as Dempsey
 Reds (1981) as Government Agent
 The Beast Within (1982) as Doc Schoonmaker
 Hammett (1982) as Lt. O'Mara
 The Shadow Riders (1982) as Sheriff Miles Gillette
 Lone Wolf McQuade (1983) as T. Tyler
 Children of the Corn (1984) as Diehl
 The Best of Times (1986) as Schutte
 Red Headed Stranger (1986) as Sheriff Reese Scoby - Driscoll, Montana
 Jocks (1987) as Coach Bettlebom
 Predator (1987) as Gen. Phillips
 Bulletproof (1988) as Miles Blackburn
 Ghetto Blaster (1989) as Curtis
 Trapper County War (1989) as Pop Luddigger
 Dick Tracy (1990) as Pruneface
 Warlock: The Armageddon (1993) as Franks
 Dead Center (1993) as Art Fencer
 Payback (1995) as Mac
 Invasion of Privacy (1996) as Sam Logan - Storekeeper
 Purgatory (1999) as Coachman
 The Waking (2001) as Edward Sloan (final film role)

Selected television

References

Further reading

External links

Robert G. Armstrong at the University of Wisconsin's Actors Studio audio collection

1917 births
2012 deaths
American male film actors
American male stage actors
Male Western (genre) film actors
American male television actors
Male actors from Birmingham, Alabama
Male actors from Los Angeles
Samford University alumni
University of North Carolina at Chapel Hill alumni
20th-century American male actors
People from Pleasant Grove, Alabama
People from Studio City, Los Angeles
Western (genre) television actors
Hueytown High School alumni